Heletz oil field is an Israeli oil field  discovered in 1955.

History
Heletz is one of the biggest on-shore oil fields in Israel. It began production in 1960 and produces oil.

See also
Economy of Israel

References

Oil fields in Israel